The Prison (Escape) Act 1706 (6 Ann c 12) was an Act of the Parliament of England. It dealt with escapes from the King's Bench Prison and Fleet Prison.

This Act is chapter IX in common printed editions.

The whole Act, so far as unrepealed, was repealed by section 1 of, and Schedule 1 to, the Statute Law Revision Act 1948.

Section 5
This section was repealed by section 39 of, and Schedule 3 to, the Sheriffs Act 1887.

Section 6
This section was repealed by section 1 of, and the Schedule to, the Statute Law Revision Act 1887.

See also
Prison Act
The text of the act

References
Halsbury's Statutes,

Acts of the Parliament of England